Cdc42 effector protein 1 is a protein that in humans is encoded by the CDC42EP1 gene.

CDC42 is a member of the Rho GTPase family that regulates multiple cellular activities, including actin  polymerization. The protein encoded by this gene is a CDC42 binding protein that mediates actin cytoskeleton reorganization at the plasma membrane. The encoded protein, which is secreted, is primarily found in bone marrow. Two transcript variants encoding different isoforms have been found for this gene.

References

External links

Further reading